Paul McKenzie (born 2 February 1968) is an Australian sailor. He competed in the Finn event at the 1996 Summer Olympics.

References

External links
 

1968 births
Living people
Australian male sailors (sport)
Olympic sailors of Australia
Sailors at the 1996 Summer Olympics – Finn
People from Colac, Victoria